Peyia (also spelt Pegeia) is a town in the Paphos District of Cyprus. Pegeia is situated mainly on the steep slopes of the coastal hills inland from Coral Bay, at the southern end of the Akamas Peninsula, and it lies 14 km northwest of Paphos. It has a large British population and a growing number of holiday homes and apartments. In the town centre can be found the town hall, a church, a police station and several small shops, restaurants and banks. Due to its hillside location many parts of the town offer views over Coral Bay and Paphos.

Pegeia actually covers a large area stretching from the Pegeia Forest on the hills high above the village in the north, to the sea in the south, and from the Bay of Maa in the east to the Akamas Peninsula in the west. However the name is used more frequently in respect to the town.

History

Pegeia Name History

The origin of the name Pegeia, is said to derive from the Latin word Baia (Bay) due to the close proximity of Coral Bay (Maa), which served as a natural safe docking for Egyptian cargo vessels dating back to antiquity. The village was first settled by Venetians, during the Venetian Domination of Cyprus (1489-1570), probably by Venetian merchant sailors and or by sailors of the Venetian fleet in conflict with the Ottomans over Cyprus rule.

The beginning of the Ottoman rule (1571-1878), saw the relationship between the Eastern Orthodox and the Ottomans healthier than in comparison with the Catholic and Ottomans, as a result many of the Venetian settlements on the island, that of Pegeia included, had by then already assimilated into Orthodox Christianity as well as Greek-Cypriot way of life.

Distinctively one can notice that the Cypriot Greek dialect in this region, including nearby villages of Kathikas, Akoursos, and Kissonerga has a characteristic singing and fluctuating tone that resembles very much the Italian way of speech. This can be more distinctively noticeable in conversations amongst elders.

Pegeia Vrisi 
In the past, villagers had to collect their water from the local spring or 'vrisi'. It was here that everyone met, especially the young men of the village who would congregate to watch the young girls collecting water in their red clay pitchers. It is said that to drink the Pegeia spring water made the girls beautiful and several songs were written about the vrisi, one of which, 'Spring of Pegeia Woman' is still sung today. The vrisi is still visible though little visited except by newly weds, as this is where a great number of wedding ceremonies are now conducted. The vrisi is in a paved area to one side of the municipal car park in the centre of the village.

Geography

Climate

Culture

Local Amenities
Pegeia, like many other towns in the Paphos region, sports a large number of cafes and restaurants along the main road of Coral Bay. More places to eat are being built on the next road in, to the east of the main strip, suggesting there is no shortage of demand. These range from taverns, meze houses and traditional cafes, to themed restaurants hosting, for example, Cypriot nights. The next significant town is Kathikas, which again has an impressive range of eateries, as well as the Sterna Winnery. The town is serviced by butchers, a fish market and a bakery, in addition to the large supermarket called Phillipos opposite the church.

Sports
The towns' football team APOP Kinyras Peyias FC formerly played in the Cypriot First Division but dissolved after bankruptcy in 2012. Now the town's current football team is Peyia 2014 which was formed by a merger of Peyia FC 2012 and PAS Peyia. In the 2018/19 season they compete in the Cypriot Third Division.

Notability
Since 2019, the town has received increased media coverage since professional footballer Gerard Piqué and international pop singer Shakira acquired a residence in the region.

References

 
Municipalities in Paphos District